The division sign  is a symbol consisting of a short horizontal line with a dot above and another dot below, used in Anglophone countries to indicate mathematical division. However, this usage, though widespread in some  countries, is not universal; it is used for other purposes in other countries and its use to denote division is not recommended in the ISO 80000-2 standard for mathematical notation.

In mathematics

The obelus, a historical glyph consisting of a horizontal line with (or without) one or more dots, was first used as a symbol for division in 1659, in the algebra book  by Johann Rahn, although previous writers had used the same symbol for subtraction.  Some near-contemporaries believed that John Pell, who edited the book, may have been responsible for this use of the symbol. Other symbols for division include the slash or solidus , the colon , and the fraction bar (the horizontal bar in a vertical fraction). The ISO 80000-2 standard for mathematical notation recommends only the solidus  or "fraction bar" for division, or the "colon"  for ratios; it says that the  sign "should not be used" for division.

In Italy, Poland and Russia, the  sign was sometimes used to denote a range of values, and in Scandinavian countries it was used as a negation sign.

Historically, an oblique form of the obelus,  (commercial minus sign), has also been used to represent subtraction in Northern Europe; such usage continued in some parts of Europe, including Norway and—until fairly recently—Denmark.

In computer systems

Encoding
The symbol was assigned to code point 0xF7 in ISO 8859-1, as the "division sign". This encoding was transferred to Unicode as U+00F7.

Keyboard entry
In Microsoft Windows, this division sign is produced with Alt+0247 (or 246 with no zero) on the number pad, or by pressing  when an appropriate keyboard layout is in use.

It may also be produced using its Unicode code-point (F7), by pressing .

In LaTeX, the division sign is obtained by the command .

In ChromeOS (with International/Extended keyboard setting), the division sign is obtained by pressing . Otherwise, the Unix-style methods may be used.

See also
 Plus and minus signs
 Multiplication sign

Notes

External links
Jeff Miller: Earliest Uses of Various Mathematical Symbols
Michael Quinion: Where our arithmetic symbols come from

Mathematical symbols
Typographical symbols
Division (mathematics)
Ancient Greek punctuation